Major General David McMurtrie Gregg is a monumental statue located in Reading, Pennsylvania, United States. The monument was designed by Henry Augustus Lukeman and consists of an equestrian statue depicting David McMurtrie Gregg, a military officer who had served in the Union Army during the American Civil War. The monument was dedicated in 1922, several years after Gregg's death in Reading in 1916.

History 
David McMurtrie Gregg was born in Huntingdon, Pennsylvania, in 1833. He attended and graduated from the United States Military Academy and served as an officer in the Union Army during the American Civil War. During the war, he attained the rank of Major General and was involved in many battles involving the Army of the Potomac. During the Battle of Gettysburg, he distinguished himself by leading cavalry forces that helped the Union win the battle. He resigned in 1865, following which he lived in Reading, Pennsylvania, where he led an active civic life. He died on August 7, 1916, in Reading.

Following his death, a monument was erected in his honor in Reading. The monument, which consisted of an equestrian statue of Gregg, was designed by sculptor Henry Augustus Lukeman of New York City. The monument, one of several in the city, would be located in the city's Centre Park, at the triangular intersection of Centre Avenue, Fourth Street, and Olney Street. It was dedicated on June 17, 1922, with a parade held as part of the dedication ceremonies.

In 1994, the monument was surveyed as part of the Save Outdoor Sculpture! project. Around August 1995, over 70 years after its dedication, the monument was restored and rededicated.

Design 
The monument consists of an equestrian statue of Gregg atop a pedestal. The statue is bronze, while the pedestal is polished pink granite. Gregg is depicted in his military attire, with a saber in his right hand and the horse's reins in his left.An inscription on the rear of the sculpture's base reads "AUGUSTUS LUKEMAN 1922". The pedestal has two steps near its base and is surrounded by a brick plaza. 

The front of the pedestal bears the following in bronze letters: "MAJOR GENERAL / DAVID MCMURTRIE GREGG". An inscription on the rear of the pedestal reads, "GETTYSBURG / 1863 Erected by / The Commonwealth of Pennsylvania", while a bronze plaque affixed to a side of the pedestal reads, "State Commission / Ira Stratton, Chmn / Daniel K. Hoch, Sec / Wellington M. Bertolet / Isaac Hiester / Richmond L. Jones / Eli M. Rapp / William M. Fleckman".

See also 
 List of equestrian statues in the United States

References

Sources

Further reading 
 

1922 establishments in Pennsylvania
1922 sculptures
Bronze sculptures in Pennsylvania
Buildings and structures in Reading, Pennsylvania
Equestrian statues in Pennsylvania
Outdoor sculptures in Pennsylvania
Sculptures of men in Pennsylvania
Tourist attractions in Reading, Pennsylvania
Union (American Civil War) monuments and memorials in Pennsylvania